Alan Willett (June 27, 1947 – September 8, 1999) was executed at age 52 for the 1993 murders of his 13-year-old son, Eric, and his mentally disabled brother, Roger Willett, in Johnson County, Arkansas.  Willett's daughter Ruby Ann Willett and another son, Jonathan, survived the attack.

Murders
Alan Willett was sentenced to death for convictions in the 1993 Johnson County killings of his 13-year-old son, Eric, and his mentally disabled brother, Roger. Alan Willett's daughter and another son survived the attack. Willett said that he wanted to die and waived his right to post-conviction remedies.

Execution
Willett's last meal was beef jerky, barbecue-flavored potato chips, onion dip, garlic dip, buttered popcorn, and Pepsi.

Mark Gardner was also executed by the state of Arkansas on the same day for the unrelated murders of Joe Joyce, Martha Joyce, and Sara McCurdy. Gardner was executed first because he had a lower inmate number (SK901) than Willett (SK930). The injection of a lethal drug was administered to Willett at 9:02 p.m. CDT, and he was pronounced dead at 9:16.

Willett made no last statement.

Willett was the 4th condemned inmate to be put to death in 1999 in Arkansas and the 21st person executed by the state of Arkansas since Furman v. Georgia, after new capital punishment laws were passed in Arkansas and that came into force on March 23, 1973.

He was also the 570th person executed overall since the United States resumed executions on January 17, 1977.

See also
 Capital punishment in Arkansas
 Capital punishment in the United States
 List of people executed in Arkansas

References
Papal Appeal for Men on Death Row Sent to Arkansas Governor from the United States conference of Catholic Bishops
The Morning news of Arkansas: “Gardner, Willett are put to death”  page A1

1956 births
1999 deaths
1993 murders in the United States
American people convicted of murder
People executed for murder
20th-century executions by Arkansas
People executed by Arkansas by lethal injection
20th-century executions of American people
People convicted of murder by Arkansas
Familicides